The Tiền River ( or ) is the main northern branch of the Mekong through Vietnam.

The Mekong separates at Phnom Penh into the main northern branch of the Mekong proper - called the Tiền River after entering Vietnam - and the southern branch of the Bassac River - which is called the Hậu River ( or ) after entering Vietnam.

In Vietnam, distributaries of the northern branch sông Tiền or Tiền Giang include the Mỹ Tho River, the Ba Lai River, the Hàm Luông River, and the Cổ Chiên River.

References

Mekong River
Rivers of An Giang province
Rivers of Bến Tre province
Rivers of Vietnam